Sanchai Ratiwatana and Sonchat Ratiwatana were the defending champions, but they lost in the final 3-6, 4-6 against Jonathan Marray and Jamie Murray.

Seeds

Draw

Draw

External links
Draw

Challenger Salinas Diario Expreso - Doubles
2010 Doubles